Elvia Ipamy (born 27 September 1994) is a Congolese football striker who plays for Primeiro de Agosto in the Angolan league.

In September 2020, Ipamy joined Angolan side C.D. Primeiro de Agosto.

References

1994 births
Living people
Republic of the Congo footballers
Republic of the Congo international footballers
Étoile du Congo players
ACNFF players
AS Mangasport players
C.D. Primeiro de Agosto players
TP Mazembe players
Association football forwards
Republic of the Congo expatriate footballers
Expatriate footballers in Gabon
Republic of the Congo expatriate sportspeople in Gabon
Expatriate footballers in Saudi Arabia
Republic of the Congo expatriate sportspeople in Saudi Arabia
Expatriate footballers in the Democratic Republic of the Congo
Republic of the Congo expatriate sportspeople in the Democratic Republic of the Congo